The 2017 CCT Arctic Cup was held May 19 to 21 at the Taimyr Ice Arena in Dudinka, Russia. The event was the second edition the Arctic Cup, and was officially the first event of the 2017-18 women's World Curling Tour (which typically begins in September). The event was won by the Russian national team, skipped by Anna Sidorova who defeated Canada's Jennifer Jones rink in the final. The total purse for the event was $US 100,000.

Teams
The teams are listed as follows:

Round-robin standings 
Final round-robin standings

Round-robin results
All draw times are listed in Krasnoyarsk Standard Time (UTC+07:00).

Draw 1
Friday, May 19, 10:00

Draw 2
Friday, May 19, 13:30

Draw 3
Friday, May 19, 17:00

Draw 4
Saturday, May 20, 9:00

Draw 5
Saturday, May 20, 13:00

Draw 6
Saturday, May 20, 16:30

Playoffs
Source:

Semifinals
Sunday, May 21, 7:00

Third place game
Sunday, May 21, 11:00

Final
Sunday, May 21, 11:00

References

External links
CurlingZone
Curling Zone
Official Site

2017 in Russian sport
2017 in curling
May 2017 sports events in Russia
International curling competitions hosted by Russia
Sport in Krasnoyarsk Krai